Joe King was a fictional character in a comic strip in the UK comic The Beano. He first appeared in The Beano in issue 2783, dated 18 November 1995. His name was a pun on "Joking."

Joe wore a big red cap with a wavy bit going up, and would tell jokes sent in by Beano readers, who would originally win a Dennis the Menace cycle helmet if their joke were published. Later on came Joe's Joke Corner which would occupy a corner of the page (usually Billy Whizz and Crazy for Daisy), again featuring jokes from Beano readers, as did Anyone Got Any Jokes? from 2001, and also Joe King's Top 40 Joke Box. 
On the Beano Club pages for a while in 2002 there was "Joe's Joke Spot". He appears briefly in the Beano Christmas Special 2007 along with all the Beano stars of a few years earlier, as the story was a reprint. Due to Billy Whizz being reprinted as well, a Joke Corner appeared once in June 2008, and again in January 2009.

In 2015, he returned as a Funsize Funnie by Lew Stringer.

DC Thomson Comics strips
Beano strips
Fictional comedians